The 1980–81 North Carolina Tar Heels men's basketball team represented University of North Carolina. Led by senior guard-forward Al Wood, it won the 1981 ACC Tournament and reached the championship of the NCAA Tournament, falling to Indiana University 63-50.  The head coach was Dean Smith. The team played its home games at Carmichael Auditorium in Chapel Hill, North Carolina.

Roster

Schedule and results

|-
!colspan=9 style=| Regular Season

|-
!colspan=9 style=| ACC Tournament

|-
!colspan=9 style=| NCAA Tournament

NCAA basketball tournament
West
North Carolina 74, Pittsburgh 57
North Carolina 61, Utah 56
North Carolina 82, Kansas State 68
Final Four
North Carolina 78, Virginia 65
Indiana 63, North Carolina 50

Rankings

Awards and honors
 Sam Perkins, ACC Rookie of the Year

Team players drafted into the NBA

References

North Carolina
North Carolina Tar Heels men's basketball seasons
NCAA Division I men's basketball tournament Final Four seasons
North Carolina
Tar
Tar